Lights may refer to

People
Lights (musician) (born 1987), Canadian singer songwriter 
Zion Lights (born 1984), English Green activist

Music
Lights (BTS song)
Lights (Ellie Goulding song)
Lights (Brigade album), album by the group Brigade
Lights (Archive album), album by the group Archive 
Lights (EP), extended play record by the musician Lights

See also
Light (surname)
Light (disambiguation)